Stanley Miller Williams (April 8, 1930January 1, 2015) was an American contemporary poet, as well as a translator and editor. He produced over 25 books and won several awards for his poetry. His accomplishments were chronicled in Arkansas Biography. He is perhaps best known for reading a poem at the second inauguration of Bill Clinton. One of his best-known poems is "The Shrinking Lonesome Sestina."
He was the father of American singer-songwriter Lucinda Williams.

Early life
Williams was born in Hoxie, Arkansas, to Ernest Burdette and Ann Jeanette Miller Williams.  He was educated in Arkansas, first enrolling at Hendrix College in Conway and eventually transferring to Arkansas State University in Jonesboro, where he published his first collection of poems, Et Cetera, while getting his bachelor's degree in biology.  He went on to get a masters in zoology at the University of Arkansas in 1952.

Career
He taught in several universities in various capacities, first as a professor of biology and then of English literature, and in 1970 returned to the University of Arkansas as a member of the English Department and the creative writing program.  In 1980 he helped found the University of Arkansas Press, where he served as director for nearly 20 years.  At the time of his death, he was a professor emeritus of literature at the University of Arkansas.

Poetry
Miller received the 1963–64 Amy Lowell Poetry Travelling Scholarship, and he won the 1991 Poets' Prize for his collection Living on the Surface.

In 1997, President Bill Clinton selected Williams to read his poem "Of History and Hope" at Clinton's second inauguration, instantly bringing Williams to national attention.  In addition, President Clinton presented Williams with the National Arts Award for his lifelong contribution to the arts.

Personal life
Miller had spina bifida. He died on January 1, 2015, of Alzheimer's disease. In February, 2016, his daughter Lucinda Williams released a song entitled "If My Love Could Kill," as a testament to her father's suffering from this disability.

Williams lived in Fayetteville with his wife Jordan.  Besides their daughter Lucinda Williams, a three-time Grammy Award winning country music, folk, and rock singer, named "America's best songwriter" by TIME magazine in 2002, they had a son, Robert, and another daughter, Karyn, who graduated from the School of Nursing at the University of Arkansas. Williams also had three grandchildren, and eight great-grandchildren.

Awards
During his lifetime, Williams received numerous awards in recognition of his work, including:

 Henry Bellman Award (1957)
 Bread Loaf Writers' Conference Fellowship in Poetry (1961)
 Amy Lowell Poetry Travelling Scholarship (1963–1964)
 Fulbright Professorship, National University of Mexico (1970)
 New York Arts Fund Award (1970)
 Prix de Rome in Poetry (1976)
 Poets' Prize for Living on the Surface (1990)
 John William Corrington Award for Literary Excellence (1993–1994)
 National Arts Award (1997)
 The Porter Fund Literary Prize Lifetime Achievement Award (2009)

Books
 A Circle of Stone, 1965
 So Long at the Fair, 1968
 Halfway from Hoxie, 1973
 Why God Permits Evil, 1977, Louisiana State University Press
 The Boys on Their Bony Mules, 1983, Louisiana State University Press
 Patterns of Poetry, 1986, Louisiana State University Press
 Living on the Surface, 1989
 Adjusting to the Light, 1992, University of Missouri Press
 Points of Departure, 1994
 The Ways We Touch: Poems, 1997, University of Illinois Press
 Some Jazz a While: Collected Poems, 1999, University of Illinois Press, 
 Making a Poem: Some Thoughts About Poetry and the People Who Write It, 2006, Louisiana State University Press, 
 Time and the Tilting Earth: Poems, 2008, Louisiana State University Press,

References

Sources
 Farnsworth, Elizabeth. Jan. 16, 1996. Interview with Miller Williams. American Poetry/PBS Online Newshour. 
 Rosenthal, Harry. Jan 20, 1997. "Poet Addresses Inaugural Event." Washington Post. 
"Miller Williams." 2003. Entry in Contemporary Authors Online. Gale.
Gatewood, Willard B. October 28, 2009. "Miller Williams." Encyclopedia of Arkansas History and Culture

Further reading
 Burns, Michael (ed.) 1991. Miller Williams and the Poetry of the Particular. Columbia, Mo: University of Missouri Press.
 Correspondence and other materials. Miller Williams Collection, 1950–1995. Fayetteville, Ar: University of Arkansas Libraries, Special Collections Division, Manuscript Collection 1387.  http://libinfo.uark.edu/specialcollections/findingaids/todd.html

1930 births
2015 deaths
American male poets
Poets from Arkansas
People from Lawrence County, Arkansas
People with spina bifida
Arkansas State University alumni
University of Arkansas alumni
University of Arkansas faculty
Hendrix College alumni
20th-century American poets
21st-century American poets
20th-century American translators
21st-century American translators
Deaths from dementia in Arkansas
Deaths from Alzheimer's disease
20th-century American male writers
21st-century American male writers
American inaugural poets